The 2008–09 FA Women's Premier League season was the 17th season of the FA Women's Premier League. England's highest national league at that time.

National Division

Top scorers

Northern Division

Southern Division

References
Standings at women.soccerway.com

Eng
FA Women's National League seasons
Wom
1